Geister is a surname of:

Hans Geister (1928–2012), German athlete
Iztok Geister (born 1945), Slovene writer, poet, essayist and ornithologist
Paul Geister (born 1972), Australian rules footballer
William Geister (1876-1942), American politician

See also
Geisters, an anime series aired on TV Tokyo from October 6, 2001 to March 30, 2002
The Geisters, villains from the Japanese animated television series Brave Exkaiser